Carl Erickson may refer to:
Bud Erickson (1916–2008), Carleton Lyons "Bud" Erickson, American football offensive lineman
Carl Erickson (illustrator) (1891–1958), American fashion illustrator and advertising artist
Carl Erickson (screenwriter) (1908–1935), American screenwriter

See also
 Carl Ericson (born 1996), Swedish ice hockey player
 Karl L. Ericson (1895–1965), American football and basketball coach